Vanity Teen is an independent biannual fashion magazine based in New York, United States and London, United Kingdom, edited by Toni Pérez and Luis Alonso Murillo. It features young artists' work of new models from agencies around the world. Vanity Teen videos have also gained fashion media attention and have reached over one million views on YouTube.

History
The magazine was founded by Barcelona-based photographer Toni Pérez, Zaragoza-based photographer Victor Soria and graphic designer Miguel Saburido in 2009. Toni Pérez, who was already involved in teenage fashion projects, contacted Miguel Saburido due to his interested in his graphic design work.

In March 2012 after 3 years and 12 issues, Vanity Teen announced its first print edition to be available for purchase worldwide starting in May 2012.

On 1 November 2014 Costa Rican photographer Luis Alonso Murillo—who originally joined in 2011—became the deputy editor  of the magazine during the launch of the new website.

Content 
Content published in Vanity Teen magazine is made by professional or aspiring young artists such as fashion designers, illustrators, painters, photographers and filmmakers. It also features original editorials and interviews of young people involved in fashion-related areas.

After the release of its print version, the digital edition is still available through a monthly subscription in Joomag, and archives available in Magpile and Issuu. A new website was released along with the new print edition, which publishes exclusive content and editorials.

Covers and editorials
Some models and people who have been featured in Vanity Teen covers and editorials include Eitan Bernath, Ash Stymest, Barrett Pall, Luke Worrall, Nick Hissom, RJ King, Francisco Lachowski, Cole Mohr, Marlon Teixeira, Cameron Dallas and more.

Vanity Teen China
In early 2021, Vanity Teen announced the launch of a new magazine oriented to the Chinese market called "Vanity Teen China, young attitude" featuring some of the newest emerging talents from the fashion and media industry in China, such as  X Nine's Wu Jiacheng, Aarif Lee and Lelush.

References

External links
 Official website

2006 establishments in the United Kingdom
Biannual magazines published in the United Kingdom
Fashion magazines published in the United Kingdom
Magazines published in London
Magazines established in 2006